Wendel Santana Pereira Santos, most known as Wendel (born October 8, 1981 in Itapetinga-BA), is a Brazilian defensive midfielder. He currently plays for Boa Esporte.

In December 2012, after backing to Palmeiras wished by Gilson Kleina, Wendel said was disrespected by Felipão, former coach of the club, that sent the player for loans.

Honours
Iraty
Paraná State Championship: 2002

Palmeiras
São Paulo State Championship: 2008
Campeonato Brasileiro Série B: 2013

References

External links
 sambafoot
 Guardian Stats Centre
 palmeiras.globo.com
 zerozero.pt
 CBF
 globoesporte

1981 births
Living people
Brazilian footballers
Campeonato Brasileiro Série A players
Campeonato Brasileiro Série B players
Esporte Clube Vitória players
Iraty Sport Club players
Clube Atlético Juventus players
Sociedade Esportiva Palmeiras players
Santos FC players
Club Athletico Paranaense players
Grêmio Barueri Futebol players
Associação Atlética Ponte Preta players
Boa Esporte Clube players
Clube Atlético Joseense players
Association football midfielders